Four Square is a chain of supermarkets in New Zealand that was founded by John Heaton Barker. It has 230 stores throughout New Zealand, mostly in small towns.  Some Four Square supermarkets previously operated in Australia under the name Friendly Grocer.

History

Four Square emerged as a household name in the 1920s out of the Foodstuffs grocery buying co-operative, whose founder, John Heaton Barker, became concerned at the manner in which the activities of the grocery chain stores of the day were making life difficult for independent grocers in Auckland. On 6 July 1922, Heaton Barker called together members of the Auckland Master Grocers Association and discussed their plans for forming a cooperative buying group of independent grocers. On 1 April 1925, this buying group registered a company called Foodstuffs Ltd, which was the first of three regional cooperatives based in Auckland, Wellington and Christchurch.

The name Four Square emerged when Heaton Barker, while talking on the telephone to one of the buying group members on 4 July 1924, drew a square around the 4 of the date on his calendar. He considered this to be a suitable name for the buying group, stating that "they would stand ’Four Square’ to all the winds that blew".

By the end of 1924 products were appearing under the Four Square name, and by 1929 discussions were underway on the use of a common branding on stores. Early versions of the Four Square sign were produced in the form of red and gold hand painted glass panels for display in members’ stores. The "Mr 4 Square" symbol, also known as "Cheeky Charlie", was developed in the 1950s. The image is associated with the art of New Zealand artist Dick Frizzell, who has used the iconic character in many of his works.

In February 1948, in Onehunga, Phil Barker (the son of the founder of the group) and Ray McGregor opened Four Square's – and the country's – first self-service grocery store (where shoppers take groceries off the shelf, rather than an attendant doing it for them), and this format soon became the norm for grocery retailing in New Zealand.

Stores

There are 169 Four Square stores on the North Island, including 24 in Northland, 21 in Auckland, six on the Coromandel Peninsula, 19 in the rest of the Waikato Region, 20 in Bay of Plenty, 5 in the Gisborne District, 16 in the Hawke's Bay Region, 15 in Taranaki, 20 in Manawatū-Whanganui and 13 in the Wellington Region. There are 62 Four Square stores on the South Island and Stewart Island, including six in Nelson and Tasman, three in Marlborough, four on the West Coast, 16 in Canterbury, 20 in Otago and 13 in Southland.

References

External links

 Four Square website

1924 establishments in New Zealand
Food and drink companies based in Auckland
Food and drink companies established in 1924
Retail companies established in 1924
Supermarkets of New Zealand
New Zealand companies established in 1924